Oidaematophorus giganteus is a moth in the family Pterophoridae. It is found on Sicily, Corsica and Sardinia and in Portugal, France and Italy.

Description
The lobes are dorsally curved and acute. The male genitalia valve is elongated from the left, but is still straight and half as long as the right valve. Meantime, the right valve is of the same shape, but lacks a saccular spine, which the left one has. The female genitalia have flattened Ostium, while the antrum is narrowed, identically to Oidaematophorus constanti.

Habitat
The larvae feed on Inula hellenium and Mediterranean fleabane (Pulicaria odora).

References

Oidaematophorini
Moths described in 1855
Plume moths of Europe
Taxa named by Josef Johann Mann